Audio compact cassettes use magnetic tape of three major types which differ in fundamental magnetic properties, the level of bias applied during recording, and the optimal time constant of replay equalization. Specifications of each type were set in 1979 by the International Electrotechnical Commission (IEC). By this time, Type I (IEC I, 'ferric' or 'normal' tapes) included pure gamma ferric oxide formulations, Type II (IEC II, or 'chrome' tapes) included ferricobalt and chromium dioxide formulations, and Type IV (IEC IV, or 'metal' tapes) included metal particle tapes—the best-performing, but also the most expensive. In the 1980s the lines between three types blurred. Panasonic developed evaporated metal tapes that could be made to match any of the three IEC types. Metal particle tapes migrated to Type II and Type I, ferricobalt formulations migrated to Type I. By the end of the decade performance of the best Type I ferricobalt tapes (superferrics) approached that of Type IV tapes; performance of entry-level Type I tapes gradually improved until the very end of compact cassette production.

Double-layer Type III (IEC III, ferrichrome or ferrochrome) tape formulations, advanced by Sony and BASF in the 1970s, never gained substantial market presence. 'Type 0' was a non-standard designation for early compact cassettes that did not conform to IEC specification; in the 21st century it is informally used to denote any low quality or counterfeit cassette.

Tape specifications

Magnetic properties 
Magnetic recording relies on the use of hard ferrimagnetic or ferromagnetic materials. These require strong external magnetic fields to be magnetized, and retain substantial residual magnetization after the magnetizing field is removed. Two fundamental magnetic properties, relevant for audio recording, are:
 Saturation remanence limits maximum output level and, indirectly, dynamic range of audio recordings.
 Coercivity is a measure of external magnetic flux required to magnetize the tape, and an indicator of necessary bias level. High coercivity particles are more difficult to erase, bias and record, but also less prone to high-frequency losses during recording, and to external interference and self-demagnetization during storage.

A useful figure of merit of tape technology is the squareness ratio of the hysteresis curve. It is an indicator of tape uniformity and its linearity in analogue recording. Increase of the ratio defers the onset of compression and distortion, and allows fuller utilization of the tape's dynamic range within the limits of remanence. Squareness ratio of basic ferric tapes rarely exceeds 0.75; squareness ratio of the best tapes exceeds 0.9.

Electroacoustic properties 
Manufacturers of bulk tape provided extremely detailed technical descriptions of their product, with numerous charts and dozens of numeric parameters. From the end user viewpoint, the most important electroacoustic properties of the tape are:
Often incorrectly called recording levels, these are always expressed in terms of tapes' output, thus taking its sensitivity out of the equation. Performance at low and middle, and at treble frequencies was traditionally characterized by two related but different parameters:
 Maximum output level (MOL) is relevant at low and middle frequencies. It is usually specified at 315 (MOL315) or 400 (MOL400) Hz, and its value marks the point when the third harmonic coefficient reaches 3%. Further magnetization of the tape is technically possible, at the cost of unacceptable compression and distortion. For all types of tape, MOL reaches maximum in 125800Hz area, and drops below  and above . As a result, ferric tapes handle bass-heavy music with apparent ease compared to expensive metal tapes.
 At treble frequencies the playback head cannot reliably reproduce harmonics of the recorded signal. Once the tape reaches saturation point, any further increases in recording flux actually decrease output below SOL.
 Noise level, usually understood as bias noise (hiss) of a tape recorded with zero input signal, replayed without noise reduction, A-weighted and referred to the same level as MOL and SOL. The difference between bias noise and the noise of virgin tape is an indicator of tape uniformity. Another important but rarely quantified type of noise is modulation noise, which appears only in presence of recorded audio, and which cannot be reduced by Dolby or dbx systems. 
 Dynamic range, or signal-to-noise ratio, was usually understood as the ratio between MOL and A-weighted bias noise level. High fidelity audio requires dynamic range of at least 6065dB; the best cassettes tapes reached this threshold in the 1980s, at least partially eliminating the need for noise reduction. Dynamic range is the most important property of the tape. The higher the dynamic range of music, the more demanding it is to tape quality; alternatively, heavily compressed music sources can do well even with basic inexpensive tapes.
 Stability of playback in time. Low-quality or damaged cassette tape is notoriously prone to signal dropouts, which are absolutely unacceptable in high fidelity audio. For high quality tapes, playback stability is sometimes lumped together with modulation noise and wow and flutter into an integral smoothness parameter.

Frequency range, per se, is usually unimportant. However, at high recording levels treble output is further limited by saturation. In practice, high-level frequency range is not as important as the smoothness of midrange and treble frequency response.

Standards and references 
The original specification for Compact Cassette was set by Philips in 1962–1963. Of the three then available tape formulations that matched Philips requirements, the BASF PES-18 tape became the original reference. Other chemical companies followed with tapes of varying quality, often incompatible with BASF reference. By 1970 a new, improved generation of tapes firmly established itself on the market, and became the de facto reference for aligning tape recorders - thus the compatibility issue worsened even further. In 1971 it was tackled by the Deutsches Institut für Normung (DIN), which set the standard for chromium dioxide tapes; in 1978 the International Electrotechnical Commission (IEC) enacted the comprehensive standard on cassette tapes (IEC 60094); one year later the IEC mandated the use of notches for automatic tape type recognition. Since then, the four cassette tape types were known as IEC I, IEC II, IEC III and IEC IV. The numerals follow historic sequence in which these types were commercialized, and do not imply their relative quality or intended purpose.

An integral part of the IEC 60094 standard family is the set of four IEC reference tapes. Type I and Type II references were manufactured by BASF, Type III reference by Sony, Type IV reference by TDK. Unlike consumer tapes, which were manufactured continuously over years, each reference tape was made in a single production batch by the IEC-approved factory. These batches were made large enough to fill the need of the industry for many years. A second run was impossible, because the chemists were unable to replicate the reference with proper precision. From time to time, the IEC revised the set of references; the final revision took place in April 1994. The choice of reference tapes, and the IEC role in general has been debated. Meinrad Liebert, designer of Studer and Revox cassette decks, criticized the IEC for failing to enforce the standards and lagging behind the constantly changing market. In 1987 Liebert wrote that while the market clearly branched into distinct, incompatible "premium" and "budget" subtypes, the IEC tried in vain to select an elusive "market average"; meanwhile, the industry moved forward, disregarding outdated references. This, according to Liebert, explained sudden demand for built-in tape calibration tools that were almost unheard-of in the 1970s.

From the end user viewpoint, the IEC 60094 defined two principal properties of each type:
 Bias level for each type was set equal to optimal bias of the relevant IEC reference tape, and sometimes changed with the IEC changed the reference tapes. Type II bias ('high bias') equals around 150% of Type I bias, Type IV bias ('metal bias') equals around 250% of Type I bias. Real cassettes invariably deviate from the references and require fine tuning of bias; recording with improper bias increases distortion and alters tonal balance.
 Time constant of replay equalization (often shortened to EQ) for Type I tapes equals , as in the Philips specification. The purpose of replay equalization is to compensate for treble losses during recording, which, in case of ferric cassettes, usually start at around 11.5kHz. The choice of time constant is an arbitrary decision seeking the best combination of conflicting parameters - extended treble response, maximum output, minimum noise and minimum distortion. Treble roll-off not fully compensated in the replay channel may be offset by pre-emphasis during recording. Lower replay time constants decrease apparent level of hiss (by 4dB when stepping down from 120 to ), but also decrease apparent treble saturation level, so the choice of time constants was a matter of compromise and debate. The industry and the IEC decided that it is safe to decrease time constant of Type II, III and IV to  because they are less prone to treble saturation than contemporary ferric tapes. A similar pre-emphasis was applied by duplicators of prerecorded chromium dioxide cassettes: although loaded with Type II tape, these cassettes were packaged in Type I shells and intended to be replayed as Type I.

Type I tapes  
Type I, or IEC I, ferric or 'normal' cassettes were historically the first, the most common and the least expensive; they dominated the prerecorded cassette market. Each particle of such size contains a single magnetic domain. The powder was and still is manufactured in bulk by chemical companies specializing in mineral pigments for the paint industry. Ferric magnetic layers have brown colour, its shade and intensity depending mostly on the size of particles.

Type I tapes must be recorded with 'normal' (low) bias flux and replayed with  time constant. Over time, ferric oxide technology developed continuously, with new, superior generations emerging around every five years. Cassettes of various periods and price points can be sorted into three distinct groups: basic coarse-grained tapes; advanced fine-grained, or microferric, tapes; and highest-grade ferricobalt tapes, having ferric oxide particles encapsulated in a thin layer of cobalt-iron compound. Quality Type I cassettes have higher midrange MOL than most Type II tapes, slow and gentle MOL roll-off at low frequencies, but less treble headroom than Type II. In practice that means that ferric tapes have lower fidelity compared to chromes and metals at high frequencies, but are often better at reproducing the low frequencies found in bass-heavy music.

Basic ferric tapes 

Entry-level ferric formulations are made of pure, unmodified, coarse-grained ferric oxide. Squareness ratio is mediocre, around 0.75, resulting in early but smooth onset of distortion. These tapes, historically sold as 'low noise', have high level of hiss and relatively low sensitivity; their optimal bias level is 1-2dB lower than that of IEC reference.

The group also includes most of so-called 'type 0' cassettes - a mixed bag of ferric tapes that do not meet the IEC standard or the original Philips specification. Historically, informal 'type 0' denoted early cassettes loaded with tape designed for reel-to-reel recorders. In the 1980s many otherwise decent and usable basic tapes were effectively demoted to 'type 0' status when equipment manufacturers began aligning their decks to premium ferricobalts (the latter having much higher sensitivity and bias). In the 21st century 'type 0' denotes all sorts of low-quality, counterfeit or otherwise unusable cassettes. They require unusually low bias, and even then only few of them perform on par with quality Type I tapes. A 'type 0', if usable at all, is incompatible with Dolby noise reduction: with Dolby decoder engaged, the tape sounds dull, its poor sensitivity causes severe Dolby mistracking.

Microferric tapes 
In the beginning of the 1970s, gradual technological improvements of the previous decade resulted in the second generation of Type I tapes. The first microferric (TDK SD) was introduced in 1971, and in 1973 Pfizer began marketing patented microferric powder that soon became an industry standard. The next step was to align needle-shaped particles in parallel with flux lines generated by recording head; this was done by controlled flow of liquid magnetic mix over substrate (rheological orientation), or by applying strong magnetic field while the binder was curing.

Typical microferric cassettes of the 1980s had less hiss and at least  higher MOL than basic Type I tapes, at the cost of increased print-through. Small improvements continued for thirty years, with a gradual rise of squareness ratio from 0.75 to over 0.9. Newer tapes consistently produced higher output at less distortion at the same levels of bias and audio recording signals. Transition was smooth; after introduction of new, superior formulations manufacturers often kept older ones in production, selling them in different markets or under different, cheaper, designations. Thus, for example, TDK ensured that its premium microferric AD cassette was always ahead of entry-level microferric D, having finer particles and lower noise.

Ferricobalt Type I tapes 
The third, best performing class of ferric tapes is made of fine ferric particles encapsulated in a thin  layer of cobalt-iron mix, similar in composition to cobalt ferrite.  The first cobalt-doped cassettes, introduced by 3M in 1971, had exceptionally high sensitivity and MOL for the period, and were an even match for contemporary chromium dioxide tapes - hence the trade name superferrics. Of many competing cobalt-doping technologies, the most widespread was low-temperature encapsulation of ferric oxide in aqueous solution of cobalt salts with subsequent drying at 100150°C. Encapsulated microferric particles retain needle-like shape and can be tightly packed into uniform anisotropic layers. The process was first commercialized in Japan in the early 1970s.

Dynamic range of the best ferricobalt cassettes (true superferrics) equals 6063dB dB; MOL at lower frequencies exceed MOL of Type IV tapes. Overall, superferrics are a good match to Type IV especially in recording acoustical music with a wide dynamic range. This was reflected in the price of top-of-the-line superferrics like Maxell XLI-S or TDK AR-X, which by 1992 matched the price of 'entry-level' metal tapes.

Type II tapes  

IEC Type II tapes are intended for recording with high (150% of normal) bias and replay with 70μs time constant. All generations of Type II reference tapes, including the 1971 DIN reference that pre-dated the IEC standard, were manufactured by BASF. Type II has been historically known as 'chromium dioxide tape' or simply 'chrome tape', but in reality most of Type II cassettes do not contain chromium. The "pseudochromes" (including almost all Type II's made by the Big Three Japanese makers - Maxell, Sony and TDK) are actually ferricobalt formulations optimized for Type II recording and playback settings. A true chrome tape may have a distinctive 'old crayon' smell, more specifically, any oil or wax chalks that have Chrome dioxide pigments in them like chrome yellow, which is missing in "pseudochromes". Both kinds of Type II have, on average, lower treble MOL and SOL, and higher signal-to-noise ratio than quality Type I tapes. This is caused by midrange and treble pre-emphasis applied during recording to match 70μs equalization at playback.

Chromium dioxide tapes 
In the middle of 1960s DuPont created and patented industrial process of making fine ferromagnetic particles of chromium dioxide (CrO2). First CrO2 tapes for data and video appeared in 1968. In 1970 BASF, who would become the main proponent of CrO2, launched its chrome cassette production; in the same year Advent introduced the first cassette deck with chrome capability and Dolby noise reduction. The combination of low noise CrO2 tape with companding noise reduction brought a revolutionary improvement to compact cassette sound, almost reaching high fidelity level. However, CrO2 tape required redesign of bias and replay equalization circuitry. This problem was resolved during the 1970s but three unsolved issues remained: the cost of making CrO2 powder, the cost of royalties charged by DuPont, and the pollution effects of hexavalent chromium waste.

Owing to very 'clean', uniform shape of the particles, chrome tapes easily attain almost perfect  squareness ratio of 0.90. 'True chromes', not modified by addition of ferric additives or coatings, have very low and euphonic hiss (bias noise), and very low modulation noise at treble frequencies. Sensitivity is usually also very high, but MOL is low, on par with basic Type I tapes. CrO2 tape does not tolerate overload: onset of distortion is sharp and dissonant, so recording levels should be set conservatively, well below MOL. At low frequencies, MOL of CrO2 tapes rolls off faster than in ferric or metal tapes, hence the reputation of 'bass shyness'. CrO2 cassettes are best fit for recording dynamic music with rich harmonic content and relatively low bass levels; their dynamic range is a good fit for recording from uncompressed digital sources and for music with extended quiet passages. Good ferric tapes may have the same or higher treble SOL, but CrO2 tapes still sound subjectively better owing to lower hiss and modulation noise.

Ferricobalt Type II tapes 
After the introduction of CrO2 cassettes Japanese companies began developing a royalty-free alternative to DuPont's patent, based on already established cobalt doping process. A controlled increase in cobalt content causes an almost linear increase in coercivity, thus a Type II "pseudochrome" can be made by simply adding around 3% cobalt to a Type I ferricobalt. By 1974 the technology was ready for mass production; TDK and Maxell introduced their classic "pseudochromes" (TDK SA and Maxell UD-XL), and killed their true chrome lines (TDK KR and Maxell CR). By 1976 ferricobalt formulations took over the video tape market, eventually they became the dominant high-performance tape for audio cassette. Chromium dioxide disappeared from Japanese domestic market, although chrome remained the tape of choice for high fidelity cassette duplication among the music labels. In consumer markets chrome coexisted, as a distant second, with "pseudochromes" until the very end of cassette era. Ferricobalt technology developed continuously; in the 1980s Japanese companies introduced 'premium' double-layered ferricobalts with exceptionally high MOL and SOL, in the middle of the 1990s TDK launched the first and only triple-coated ferricobalt, the SA-XS.

Electroacoustic properties of Type II ferricobalts are very close to those of their Type I cousins. Owing to  replay equalization, hiss level is lower, but so is the treble saturation level. Dynamic range of Type II ferricobalts, according to the 1990 tests, lies between 60 and 65dB. Coercivity of 580700Oe and remanence of 13001550G are close to the CrO2 reference, but the difference is big enough to cause compatibility problems. TDK SA was the informal reference in Japan) Since the Japanese already dominated both cassette and hi-fi equipment markets, incompatibility further undermined market share of European-made decks and CrO2 cassette. In 1987 the IEC resolved the compatibility issue by appointing a new Type II reference tape U 546 W a BASF ferricobalt with properties very close to contemporary TDK tapes. With the short lived 1988 Reference Super even BASF started the manufacture and sales of Type II ferricobalt tapes. .

Metal particle Type II tapes 
Coercivity of iron-cobalt MP mix, precipitated from aqueous solutions, depends on cobalt content. This makes possible manufacturing of MP tapes conforming to Type II and even Type I biasing requirements.

In practice, only Denon, Taiyo Yuden and, for only a few years TDK ever attempted making Type II metal tape. Independent tests of the 1990 Denon and Taiyo Yuden tapes placed them on the very top of Type II spectrum - if the recording deck could cope with unusually high sensitivity and provide unusually high bias current.

Type III tapes

Ferrichrome tapes  
In 1973 Sony introduced double-layer ferrichrome tapes, having a five-micron ferric base coated with one micron of CrO2 pigment. The new cassettes were advertized as 'the best of both worlds' - combining good low-frequency MOL of microferric tapes with good treble performance of chrome tapes. The novelty became part of the IEC standard, codenamed Type III; the Sony CS301 formulation became the IEC reference. However, the idea failed to attract followers. Apart from Sony, only BASF, Scotch and Agfa introduced their own ferrichrome cassettes.

These expensive tapes never gained substantial market share, and after the release of metal tapes they lost their perceived exclusivity. Their place in the market was taken over by superior and less expensive ferricobalt formulations. By 1983, tape deck manufacturers stopped providing Type III recording option. Ferrichrome tape remained in BASF and Sony lineups until 1984 and 1988 respectively.

The use of ferrichrome tapes was complicated by conflicting rationale of the playback of these tapes. Officially: they were intended to be played back using  equalisation. The information leaflet that Sony included in each box of the ferrichrome cassette recommended that, "If the selector has two positions, NORMAL and CrO2, set it to the NORMAL position." (which applies  equalisation). The leaflet notes that the high frequency range will be enhanced and that the tone control should be adjusted to compensate. The same leaflet recommends that if the playback machine offers a 'Fe-Cr' selection, that this should be selected. On Sony's machines, this automatically selects  equalisation. Neither Sony nor BASF cassettes feature the notches on the back surface that automatically selects  equalisation on those machines that featured an automatic detection system.

Type IV tapes

Metal particle Type IV tapes 

Pure metal particles have an inherent advantage over oxide particles due to 34times higher remanence, very high coercivity and far smaller particle size resulting in both higher MOL and SOL values. First attempts to make metal particle (MP), rather than metal oxide particle, tape date back to 1946; viable iron-cobalt-nickel formulations appeared in 1962. In early 1970s Philips began development of MP formulations for Compact Cassette. Contemporary powder metallurgy could not yet produce fine, submicron size particles, and properly passivate these highly pyrophoric powders. Although the latter problem were soon solved, the chemists did not convince the market in long-term stability of MP tapes; suspicions of inevitable early degradation persisted until the end of cassette era. The fears did not materialize: most metal tapes survived decades of storage just as well as Type 1 tapes; however, signals recorded on metal tapes do degrade at about the same rate as in chromium tapes, around 2dB over the estimated lifetime of the cassette.

Metal particle Compact Cassettes, or simply 'metals', were introduced in 1979 and were soon standardized by the IEC as Type IV. They share the  replay time constant with Type II, and can be correctly reproduced by any deck equipped with Type II equalization. Recording onto a metal tape requires special high-flux magnetic heads and high-current amplifiers to drive them. Typical metal tape is characterized by remanence of 30003500G and coercivity of 1100Oe, thus its bias flux is set at 250% of Type I level. Traditional glass ferrite heads would saturate their magnetic cores before reaching these levels. "Metal capable" decks had to be equipped with new heads built around sendust or permalloy cores, or the new generation of glass ferrite heads with specially treated gap materials.

MP tapes, particularly top-of-the-line double coated tapes, have record high midrange MOL and treble SOL, and the widest dynamic range coupled with lowest distortion.  They were always expensive, almost exclusive, out of reach of most consumers. They excel at reproducing fine nuances of uncompressed acoustic music, or music with very high treble content like brass and percussions. However, they need a high quality, properly aligned deck to reveal their  potential. First-generation MP tapes were consistently similar in their biasing requirements, but by 1983 newer formulations drifted away from each other and the reference tape.

Metal evaporated tapes 

Unlike previously described wet coating processes, metal evaporated (ME) media are fabricated by physical deposition of vaporized cobalt or cobalt-nickel mix in a vacuum chamber. There is no synthetic binder to hold particles together; instead, they adhere directly to polyester tape substrate. An electron beam melts source metal, creating a continuous directional flow of cobalt atoms towards the tape. The zone of contact between the beam and the tape is blown with a controlled flow of oxygen, which helps formation of polycrystalline metal-oxide coating. A massive liquid-cooled rotating drum, which pulls the tape into the contact zone, protects it from overheating.

ME coatings, along with barium ferrite, have the highest information density of all rerecordable media. The technology was introduced in 1978 by Panasonic, initially in the form of audio microcassettes, and matured through the 1980s. Metal evaporated media established itself in analogue (Hi8) and digital (Digital8, DV and MicroMV) videotape market, and data storage (Advanced Intelligent Tape, Linear Tape Open). The technology seemed promising for analogue audio recording; however, very thin ME layers were too fragile for consumer cassette decks, the coatings too thin for good MOL, and manufacturing costs were prohibitively high. Panasonic Type I, Type II and Type IV ME cassettes, introduced in 1984, were sold for only a few years in Japan alone, and remained unknown in the rest of the world.

Notes

References

Bibliography 

 
  
 
 
 
 
 
 
  
 
 
 
 
 
 
 
 
 
 
 
 

Tape recording
Audio storage
Inorganic chemistry
Technology-related lists